Chakra is a 2021 Indian Tamil-language action techno-thriller film written and directed by M. S. Anandan in his directorial debut. It is an stand-alone sequel to Irumbu Thirai. The film stars Vishal and Shraddha Srinath in the lead roles while Regina Cassandra played the antagonist. The film's theme is based on cybercrimes and e-commerce scams. where it revolves around two officers, who investigates about the robberies which occurred on Independence Day.

The film was released theatrically on 19 February and received mixed to positive reviews. The film became a moderate success at the box office.

Plot
50 robberies occurred on Independence Day, with two masked robbers looting houses. The entire police force is clueless without the slightest lead or evidence. ACP Gayathiri is assigned for the case investigation. Gayathri learns that the 50th house belongs to her ex-boyfriend Major Chandru. Chandru's grandmother gets injured in the theft in an attempt to safeguard the Ashoka Chakra medal, which was bestowed to Chandru's late father. 

Chandru joins Gayathri in the investigation to retrieve the medal and solve the case. Chandru checks the case details and information from the victims, only to realize that the robbers knew the exact location of Jewels in every house. Chandru lists down the people who can get access to houses and realizes that a company known as Dial For Help may be involved in the case and all 50 houses had been serviced by the company under a common number belonging to a person named Marimuthu. The police rush to Marimuthu's house, only to find his wife there. Marimuthu's widow explains that her husband had died two years ago. Chandru, with no other clue returns. 

Meanwhile, a mysterious person calls the Commissioner and informs that he was responsible for all the thefts thus far and challenges the entire force that no one would be able to track him down. Accepting this as a challenge, Chandru tries to provoke the unknown person, who gives a clue to his location. They realize that it refers to a place, and they rush to the place, only to find destroyed computers. Chandru heads back to share the clues, where he reveals that the clue refers to the queen in chess and that the hacker had left a partial thumbprint on the scanner used to destroy all data. Chandru further reveals that theft would occur in 58 more houses on August 23 due to the PM's arrival, where he tells that the hacker is actually a woman named Leela, a chess coach. 

A young Leela had loved her mother tremendously and both of them had a bond with each other, but her alcoholic and abusive father tortured her mother. One day, Leela woke up to find her mother died in her sleep. Her father immediately married another woman and arrived home with her two young sons. Later Leela's father revealed that he and his new wife had suffocated and killed Leela's mother. An enraged Leela killed both her father and stepmother, where she uses her stepmother's two sons as baits for her thefts. A cat-and-mouse chase begins between Leela and Chandru where Leela makes several attempts to kill Chandru and his team. Chandru manages to capture Leela and hands her over to the police. Chandru gets a call from Leela, who escaped and challenges him for another game.

Cast 

 Vishal as Major Chandru
 Shraddha Srinath as ACP Gayathri IPS
 Regina Cassandra as Leela, a chess player coach, a computer hacker
 Srushti Dange as Rithu Bhatia, "Dial For Help" CEO
 Robo Shankar as Inspector Kumar
 Nassar as Chandru's late father
 Vijay Babu as Police Commissioner
 Amit Bhargav as Ganeshan
 Manobala as Gayathri's uncle
 K. R. Vijaya as Chandru's grandmother
 Ravikanth as Dial For Help Board member
 Baby Krithika as a young Leela (cameo appearance)
 Aruldoss as Leela's late father (cameo appearance)
 Neelima Rani as Leela's late mother (cameo appearance)
 Rail Ravi as "Dial For Help" board member
 Pradeep K. Vijayan as "Dial For Help" board member
 Maha Delhi Ganesh as Leela's brother
 Arjunan as a hacker

Production 
The film was initially touted to be the sequel of Vishal's previous action thriller hacker film Irumbu Thirai, which became a success at the box office in 2018. The film was rumored to be titled Irumbu Thirai 2 as the film genre was quite similar to the former. However the film was later titled as Chakra by the filmmakers as the film story revolves around Ashoka Chakra which is the highest peacetime military decoration in India. Veteran actress K. R. Vijaya made a comeback through this film after a sabbatical of three years. In preparation for their roles, both Shraddha Srinath and Regina Cassandra underwent training in martial arts and motorcycle riding, respectively.

Music

The film score has been composed by Yuvan Shankar Raja.
Harla Farla - Yuvan Shankar Raja, Sanjana Kalmanje
Amma - Chinmayi, Prarthana
Scream of darkness(Theme)

Release

Theatrical
The film was initially supposed to have its theatrical release on 1 May 2020 coinciding with the May Day but was postponed due to the COVID-19 pandemic in India. The film was released on 19 February 2021.

Also available in Telegram

Reception

Box office
Chakra, made on a budget of 31.5 crore, collected 65 crore in its theatrical run. The film was a moderate success, despite reportedly incurring a loss of 3.5 crore.

Critical response
M Suganth of The Times of India gave the film 2.5/5, stating that the film was focused on momentary thrills, and it "feels rather tame." Sugandh added that weak writing let down Chakra. A reviewer from Sify termed the film "An average action thriller," rating it 2.5/5. On technical aspects, the reviewer wrote, "the background score of Yuvan Shankar Raja and visuals of Balasubramaniam are average." They opined that the MS Anandan's dialogues on Digital India and how the current generation losing their privacy through mobile phones and online shopping were done and dusted in Irumbu Thirai, and Robo Shankar's comic track was a needless addition.

The Hindu critic Srinivasa Ramanujan opined that the film "cashes in on a timely subject, but does little justice to it." He added: "The absence of a major romantic track and songs is a huge relief, as is the character arc of the villain, but certain key emotional elements get in the way a tad too many times,".

Controversies

Copyright issues 
Madras High Court issued a temporary stay order preventing the release of the film over copyright claims. Trident Arts studio which was initially offered to produce the film filed complaint at the High Court stating that the story of the film was initially narrated to them by the film director. It was revealed that the producer of Trident Arts, Ravi entered a contract with the director Anandan to produce the film. However, the production was later handed over to Vishal Film Factory without the consent of Trident Arts. In addition, Madras HC urged actor Vishal to pay compensation for the losses incurred by the producer of his previous film Action. The dispute between Trident Arts and Vishal Film Factory was solved just days before the film's release.

References

External links 
 
 Chakra at Telegram

2021 films
2021 action thriller films
Films postponed due to the COVID-19 pandemic
Indian action thriller films
Indian crime action films
Films scored by Yuvan Shankar Raja
Techno-thriller films
2021 directorial debut films
2020s Tamil-language films